Ganz was a municipality in Austria which merged in January 2015 with Mürzzuschlag in the district of Bruck-Mürzzuschlag in Styria, Austria.

References

Fischbach Alps
Cities and towns in Bruck-Mürzzuschlag District